Nevaldo Fleurs (born 5 December 1999) is a South African rugby union player for the  in the Currie Cup. His regular position is fly-half or fullback.

Fleurs was a mid-season addition to the  side for the 2022 Currie Cup Premier Division. He signed for the Sharks after an impressive Varsity Cup season,  during which he scoring 118 points, including 6 penalties in the final.

References

South African rugby union players
Living people
Rugby union fly-halves
Rugby union fullbacks
Sharks (Currie Cup) players
1999 births
Rugby union players from the Eastern Cape
Sharks (rugby union) players